Nika Konstantinovich Piliyev (born 21 March 1991) is a Russian former professional footballer of Ossetian descent.

Career
He made his debut in the Russian Premier League on 16 May 2009 for Lokomotiv Moscow in a game against Terek Grozny.

References

External links
 
   Profile at Official Site
   Profile at Official Site

1991 births
Living people
Footballers from Tbilisi
Russian footballers
Russia youth international footballers
Association football midfielders
Russian expatriate footballers
FC Lokomotiv Moscow players
PFC CSKA Moscow players
FC Amkar Perm players
ŠK Slovan Bratislava players
FC Volgar Astrakhan players
FC Dila Gori players
FC Urartu players
Ulisses FC players
FC Spartak Vladikavkaz players
Slovak Super Liga players
Russian Premier League players
Expatriate footballers in Slovakia
Russian expatriate sportspeople in Slovakia
Expatriate footballers in Georgia (country)
Russian expatriate sportspeople in Georgia (country)
Expatriate footballers in Armenia
Russian expatriate sportspeople in Armenia
Expatriate footballers in Latvia
Russian expatriate sportspeople in Latvia
FC Armavir players
FK RFS players